is an anime prequel OVA to The Super Dimension Fortress Macross released for the celebration of the 20th anniversary of the Macross franchise during 2002 in Japan. It was created and directed by Shoji Kawamori and produced by Satelight.

Premise
Macross Zero is set in 2008 A.D., one year before the events of the original Macross series, depicting the final battles of the U.N. Wars between the U.N. Spacy and the Anti-UN forces, and is also set in the South Pacific, where a gigantic alien spaceship crash landed 9 years earlier. Amidst the violence, a U.N. Spacy F-14 KAI pilot named Shin Kudo is attacked by a strange enemy aircraft that can transform itself into a robot. Crash landing on Mayan Island he learns that this remote island and its peaceful native inhabitants hold a great secret linking them to the alien space ship and would become the focus of the war, whether they like it or not. Shin eventually returns to his carrier fleet and joins the Skull Squadron, who also operate brand new transforming fighters, the VF-0 Phoenix. He trains and engages Anti-UN forces operating from a converted ballistic missile submarine as both sides fight to locate and control alien artifacts, with the peaceful and agrarian Mayan caught in the middle of the war.

Characters

: Japanese-American fighter pilot flying for the UN. Lost his parents early in the U.N. Wars. Voiced by Kenichi Suzumura.
Sara Nome: Priestess of Mayan Island. Highly skeptical of outsiders and the violence they bring with them. Voiced by Sanae Kobayashi.
Mao Nome: Sara's younger sister. Cheerful and outgoing, and longing to see the outside world. Also has a very obvious crush on Shin. Voiced by Yuuka Nanri.
Roy Föcker: Famed UN ace and test pilot for the new and experimental variable fighter, the VF-0. Voiced by Akira Kamiya.
Edgar LaSalle: Shynn's Radar Intercept Officer and best friend. Voiced by Sousuke Komori.
D.D. Ivanov: Ace pilot flying for the Anti-UN forces. Roy Föcker's former instructor turned rival. Flies the SV-51 Anti-U.N. variable fighter. Voiced by Ryūzaburō Ōtomo.
Nora Polyansky: Ivanov's wingmate. A ruthless and highly skilled warrior dedicated to the Anti-UN cause. Voiced by Minami Takayama.
Aries Turner: A 26-year-old government researcher known for her genius-level intelligence. She studies and gives top secret seminars about the Protoculture research being undertaken by the U.N. She has known Roy Föcker in the past, before the events that will take place in the South Pacific Ocean one year before Space War I. Voiced by Naomi Shindō.
Nutouk: The Mayan Island tribal chief. Voiced by Tamio Ōki.
Dr. Hasford: The Anti-UN scientist who theories that intelligent life on Earth might have originated off world from the Protoculture, a race of ancient aliens. Voiced by Nachi Nozawa.
The Bird-Human: Code named by the U.N. Spacy scientists as A.F.O.S. (Artifact From Outer Space), the Bird-Human is a powerful semi-sentient alien biomecha which was left on Earth by the true creators of humanity, the Protoculture. The mecha was created to check the evolution of humankind and was programmed to destroy it in case it became belligerent like the previous creation of the Protoculture, the Zentradi.

Production
The OVA was released in 2002 to celebrate the 20th anniversary of the Macross franchise in Japan. New mechanical designs inspired by those of the first Macross series were developed by Shoji Kawamori and Junya Ishikagi, while mecha and sci-fi illustrator Hidetaka Tenjin worked as an animation artist for the CGI mecha action sequences. A Blu-ray box was released on August 22, 2008, which added Sheryl Nome's earrings in a shot at the Nome beach house, to better connect the series with Macross Frontier.

Episodes

Soundtrack
Composed by Kuniaki Haishima, the OVA's soundtrack is orchestral with some tribal influences. One track, titled "VF-Zero", borrows a section of "Klendathu Drop" by Basil Poledouris, from the Starship Troopers soundtrack. The ending theme for episodes 1 and 5 is "Arkan" (which means "star" in the fictional Mayan language), performed by Holy Raz. "Life Song", the ending theme for episode 2, is by Yen Chang and Holy Raz. Yuuka Nanri performs the episode 3 ending theme "Yanyan".

Two volumes of the soundtrack were released in Japan by Victor Entertainment.

International release

Due to a current legal dispute over the distribution rights of the Macross franchise, involving Studio Nue and Big West against Harmony Gold, much of the Macross merchandise post 1999, including Macross Zero, have not received an international release.

OVA series notes
Mao Nome's reminiscences have become part of the pre-Space War legendarium of the expanding Human and Zentradi exploration of the Galaxy. The events of the movie paint the story in the style of Tales of the South Pacific, romantic and beautiful in the time before the Zentradi nearly annihilated all life on Earth during one of the most cataclysmic battles of the War. The people of the galaxy know this story as 'Bird-Human'.

During the third Macross TV series, Macross Frontier, the 10th episode ("Legend of Zero") retells the events of the OVA series as Bird Human, a movie made in on one of the colony's city ships for the entertainment of the populace. The Four Romances: one completely doomed (Captain Nora and Captain Ivanov), one tragic (Dr. Aries Turner and Captain Roy Föcker - which led to his depression and incipient alcoholism only later broken by Claudia LaSalle), one impossible but real (Mao Nome's love of Shynn Kudo), and one transcendental (Sara Nome and Lt. Shynn Kudo) make for a story of mysticism, love, music, and courage. The adaptation stars Miranda Merin (the reigning Miss Macross Frontier) as Sara Nome and Ranka Lee as Mao Nome (after the original actress is injured in a car accident on the way to the filming location). Alto Saotome, the main protagonist of Frontier, is the stunt double for the actor playing Shynn Kudo (as the actor does not do underwater scenes, as stated in his contract). Incidentally, the film's director bears a striking resemblance to series creator Shoji Kawamori.

Later episodes explicitly state that Macross Frontier singer Sheryl Nome is the granddaughter of Dr. Mao Nome, and showed a photograph of a much older but still recognizable Mao with glasses, clearly now a venerable survivor of Space War I.

All That VF - Macross 25th Anniversary Air Show (Zero Edition)
Coinciding with both the 25th anniversary of Macross and the Blu-ray releases of volume one of Macross Frontier and Macross Zero box set, the official website of Macross Frontier posted two newly animated short films featuring Air Show style demonstrations for both series. People who purchased the first pressings of either Macross Zero or Macross Frontier received a unique code to enter into the website and therefore able to watch the short film of the respective anime.

The music track for this clip was an excerpt from an orchestral track of Macross Frontier titled "Vital Force" composed by Yoko Kanno.

References

External links
Official sites:
 Official Macross website 
 Official Macross Zero website 
 Bandai Visual's Macross Zero website 
Other sites:
 
 
 Macross Zero at Macross Compendium
Macross Zero at Macross Mecha Manual
Macross Zero at Mecha and Anime Headquarters

2002 anime OVAs
Japanese aviation films
Films set in 2008
Zero
Satelight